Xôi is a savory (mặn) or sweet (ngọt) Vietnamese dish made from glutinous rice and other ingredients. Xôi is a common on-the-go breakfast item, and a popular snack nationwide. Although it is often served as a breakfast or dessert, people also eat it at lunch or dinner as a main dish in many areas in Vietnam.

Varieties

Savory
Savory xôi are called xôi mặn in Vietnamese. They include the following varieties:

Xôi ngô -  made with corn and smashed cooked mung beans
Xôi cá - fried fish xôi
Xôi chiên phồng - deep-fried glutinous rice patty
Xôi gà - with chicken
Xôi khúc - with mung bean filling with a coating of pandan leaves paste
Xôi lạc (northern Vietnamese name; called xôi đậu phộng or xôi đậu phụng in southern Vietnam) - made with peanuts
Xôi lam - cooked in a tube of bamboo of the genus Neohouzeaua and often served with grilled pork or chicken; a specialty of highland minority groups
Xôi lạp xưởng or xôi lạp xường - served with Chinese sausage, meat floss and boiled quail egg
Xôi pate - served with pâté and hams
Xôi sắn or xôi khoai mì - cooked with cassava
Xôi thập cẩm - subgum xôi
Xôi thịt kho - served with thịt kho tàu (caramelized pork and eggs)
Xôi trứng - served with fried eggs, caramelized eggs or omelette 
Xôi xéo - served with smashed mung beans, fried onions, and rousong 
Xôi xíu mại - served with siu mai

Sweet
Sweet xôi are called xôi ngọt in Vietnamese. They include the following varieties:

Xôi bắp -  made with corn, sugar, fried onions, and smashed cooked mung beans
Xôi đậu đen - made with black urad beans
Xôi đậu xanh - made with mung beans
Xôi dừa - made with coconut
Xôi gấc - made with the aril and seeds of the gấc fruit
Xôi lá cẩm (also called xôi tím) - made with the magenta plant
Xôi lá cẩm đậu xanh - made with the magenta plant and mung beans
Xôi lá dứa - made with pandan leaf extract for the green color and a distinctive pandan flavor
Xôi lam - cooked in a tube of bamboo of the genus Neohouzeaua and often served with sesame seeds and salt; a specialty of highland minority groups
Xôi lúa - with boiled waxy maize, fried shallot and mung bean paste
Xôi nếp than - made with black glutinous rice
Xôi ngũ sắc - 5-colored xôi: purple from the leaf extract of the magenta plant, green from pandan leaf, red from gấc fruit, yellow from mung beans, and the white color of natural glutinous rice
Xôi nhộng - made with silk worms
Xôi sầu riêng - made with durian
Xôi vị - hard cooked xôi with pandan leaves.
Xôi vò - the glutinous rice grains do not stick together in this type of xôi, as they are coated with ground peeled-and-boiled mung beans
Xôi xiêm - cooked with coconut juice
Xôi xoài - made with coconut milk and fresh ripe mango; of Thai origin

See also

Chè trôi nước
Okowa

References 

Vietnamese rice dishes
Vietnamese words and phrases
Thai cuisine